Boltoboy Baltaev (born 2 October 1989) is an Uzbekistani judoka.

He is the bronze medallist of the 2017 Judo Grand Prix Tashkent in the +100 kg category.

References

External links
 

1989 births
Living people
Uzbekistani male judoka
21st-century Uzbekistani people